Saint-Just-Chaleyssin is a commune in the Isère department in southeastern France. The main village is situated 16 km northeast of Vienne and 25 km south of Lyon.

Population

International relations
Saint-Just-Chaleyssin is twinned with:
  Incisa Scapaccino, Italy (1972)

See also
Communes of the Isère department

References

Communes of Isère
Isère communes articles needing translation from French Wikipedia